The Assiniboine Memorial Curling Club is located in the northwestern area of Winnipeg, in the community of St. James. The curling club was started up in 1929 and was nicknamed the 'root cellar', it had only 2 sheets of ice at the time. The AMCC moved to their current  site, at Vimy and Hamilton, in 1962. This new location was built with 4 sheets and then expanded to 8, as it has today. A small fire destroyed part of the clubrooms and arena in 1972, most of the original structure remained and was rebuilt.

In 1992 the AMCC addressed the problem of the shifting Winnipeg 'gumbo' under the ice sheets. The ice was dug out 6 feet beneath the curling rink, filled with sand, and covered with styrofoam to prevent shifting of the ice.

The AMCC is the home of the 1995 world champion Kerry Burtnyk rink

Provincial champions

References

Sports venues in Winnipeg
Curling clubs in Canada
1929 establishments in Manitoba

St. James, Winnipeg